Walter Meeuws (born 11 July 1951) is a Belgian former footballer and manager.

Playing career
During his career he played for K. Beerschot V.A.C., Club Brugge K.V., R. Standard de Liège, AFC Ajax, K.V. Mechelen. He earned 46 caps for the Belgium national football team, and participated in UEFA Euro 1980 and the 1982 FIFA World Cup.

After retiring from playing, he has been working as a manager, including a stint as the national team manager from 1989 to 1990. 

As a player, he won 4 championships, 2 with Standard in Belgium, 1 with Bruges in Belgium and 1 with Ajax in the Netherlands. He also won 2 cups and played the final of the European Championship with Belgium in Italy in 1980. He is considered one of the best Belgian defenders ever.

Managerial career
As a manager, he won 3 cups with Lierse S.K., FC Antwerp and FAR Rabat (2009), 1 Supercup with Lierse  and was runner-up in the African Champions League Final with Raja Casablanca and also runner-up with Antwerp in the final of the European Cup-Winners Cup in 1993 at Wembley. He is the last manager ever that reached a European Final with a Belgian Team.

Honours

Player 
Club Brugge

 Belgian First Division: 1979-1980
 Belgian Super Cup: 1980
 Japan Cup Kirin World Soccer: 1981
 Jules Pappaert Cup: 1978

Standard de Liège

 Belgian First Division: 1981-1982, 1982-83
 Belgian Super Cup: 1981, 1983
 European Cup Winners' Cup: 1981-82 (runners-up)
Intertoto Cup Group Winners: 1982

Ajax Amsterdam

 Eredivisie: 1984-85

KV Mechelen

 Belgian Cup: 1986–87

International 
Belgium

 UEFA European Championship: 1980 (runners-up)
 Belgian Sports Merit Award: 1980

Manager 
Royal Antwerp

 Belgian Cup: 1991-92
 UEFA Cup Winners' Cup: 1992-93 (runners-up)

Lierse SK

 Belgian Cup: 1998-99
 Belgian Super Cup: 1999

Raja de Casablanca

 CAF Champions League: 2002 (runners-up)

FAR Rabat

 Moroccan Throne Cup: 2009 (winners)

Individual 

 Belgian Professional Manager of the Year: 1992-93

References

Royal Belgian Football Association: Number of caps

Profile at Standard de Liège

1951 births
Living people
Footballers from Antwerp Province
Association football defenders
Belgian footballers
Belgian expatriate footballers
Belgium international footballers
UEFA Euro 1980 players
1982 FIFA World Cup players
K. Beerschot V.A.C. players
Club Brugge KV players
Standard Liège players
AFC Ajax players
K.V. Mechelen players
Belgian Pro League players
Eredivisie players
Expatriate footballers in the Netherlands
Belgian expatriate sportspeople in the Netherlands
Belgian football managers
Lierse S.K. managers
Al-Gharafa SC managers
Royal Antwerp F.C. managers
Belgium national football team managers
Gençlerbirliği S.K. managers
K.S.K. Beveren managers
AS FAR (football) managers
K.V. Mechelen managers
K.A.A. Gent managers
Raja CA managers
Expatriate football managers in Turkey
Expatriate football managers in Morocco
Expatriate football managers in Qatar
Expatriate football managers in the United Arab Emirates
Expatriate football managers in Egypt
Wadi Degla SC managers
Lommel S.K. managers
Belgian expatriate sportspeople in Qatar
Belgian expatriate sportspeople in the United Arab Emirates
Belgian expatriate sportspeople in Morocco
Belgian expatriate sportspeople in Egypt
Belgian expatriate sportspeople in Turkey
Botola managers